Antony P. Ressler (born October 12, 1960) is an American billionaire hedge fund manager and sports team owner. 

He co-founded the private equity firms Apollo Global Management in 1990, and Ares Management in 1997.

As of July 2022, his net worth was estimated by Forbes at $5.2 billion.

Biography
Born in 1960 to a Jewish family, Ressler was one of five children of Dorothy and Ira Ressler. His father was an attorney and World War II veteran. Ressler earned a BSFS from Georgetown University's School of Foreign Service and an MBA from Columbia Business School. After university, he worked at Drexel Burnham Lambert eventually reaching senior vice president in the high yield bond department with responsibility for the new issue/syndicate desk.

In 1990, on the heels of the collapse of Drexel Burnham Lambert, he co-founded the private equity firm Apollo Global Management with Leon Black, Drexel's managing director, head of the Mergers & Acquisitions Group, and co-head of the Corporate Finance Department; John Hannan, Drexel's former co-director of international finance; Craig Cogut, a lawyer who worked with Drexel's high-yield division in Los Angeles; Arthur Bilger, the former head of the Drexel's corporate finance department; and Marc Rowan, Josh Harris and Michael Gross, all of whom worked under Black in the mergers and acquisitions department. In 1997, he co-founded Ares Management with former Apollo Global Management co-worker John H. Kissick and Bennett Rosenthal, who joined the group from the global leveraged finance group at Merrill Lynch.

Philanthropy
Ressler is a member of the executive committee of the board of directors of the Cedars-Sinai Medical Center; finance chair and member of the executive committee of the Los Angeles County Museum of Art; a board member of Campbell Hall Episcopal School in Studio City, California; and one of the founding members of the board and finance chair of the Painted Turtle Camp, an organization that takes children with chronic and life-threatening illnesses on camping trips. Ressler is a supporter of military veterans through the work of The Greatest Generations Foundation.

Sport
In 2005, he belonged to an investment group that made a successful bid led by Mark Attanasio to purchase Major League Baseball's Milwaukee Brewers.

Since June 2015 he is the principal owner of the Atlanta Hawks basketball team, when he purchased the team for an estimated US$730 million. It was ultimately sold to him for $850 million. 

To purchase Atlanta Hawks of the National Basketball Association Ressler formed a group that includes former NBA player Grant Hill, Sara Blakely, Jesse Itzler, Steven Price, and Rick Schnall.

Personal life
On June 16, 1989, he married actress Jami Gertz. They live in Los Angeles, and have three sons: Oliver Jordan Ressler (born 1992), Nicholas Simon Ressler (born 1995), and Theo Ressler (born 1998). Gertz-Ressler High Academy, a member of Alliance College-Ready Public Schools, is named after the couple. They are members of the Wilshire Boulevard Temple.

His sister, Broadway producer Debra Ressler, is married to Apollo co-founder Leon Black. His brother, Richard Ressler,  is a principal and founder of CIM Investment management.

References

1960 births
20th-century American businesspeople
21st-century American businesspeople
Apollo Global Management people
American chief executives
American financiers
American investment bankers
American money managers
Walsh School of Foreign Service alumni
Columbia Business School alumni
Drexel Burnham Lambert
Place of birth missing (living people)
Jewish American philanthropists
Private equity and venture capital investors
Living people
Milwaukee Brewers owners
Atlanta Hawks owners
Jews and Judaism in Los Angeles
American billionaires
21st-century American Jews